Dichomeris plasticus is a moth in the family Gelechiidae. It was described by Edward Meyrick in 1904. It is found in Australia, where it has been recorded from New South Wales.

The forewings are yellow ochreous, sprinkled with fuscous, with the plical and second discal stigmata small, obscure, dark fuscous. There is a small suffused dark fuscous spot before the tornus. The hindwings are grey, but darker posteriorly.

References

Moths described in 1904
plasticus